The 2019 Moldovan "A" Division was the 29th season of Moldovan football's second-tier league. The season started on 6 April 2019 and ended on 9 November 2019.

Teams

Season summary

League table

Results
Teams will play each other twice (once home, once away).

Results by round
The following table represents the teams game results in each round.

Top goalscorers

Clean sheets

Notes

References

External links
Divizia A - Moldova - Results, fixtures, tables and news - divizia-a.md

Moldovan Liga 1 seasons
Moldova 2